Webb is a rural locality in the Cassowary Coast Region, Queensland, Australia.

References 

Cassowary Coast Region
Localities in Queensland